The Reading Eagle is the major daily newspaper in Reading, Pennsylvania. A family-owned newspaper until the spring of 2019, its reported circulation is 37,000 (daily) and 50,000 (Sundays). It serves the Reading and Berks County region of Pennsylvania.

After celebrating its sesquicentennial of local ownership and editorial control in 2018, the Reading Eagle was acquired by the Denver, Colorado-based MediaNews Group (also known as Digital First Media) in May 2019.

History 
The newspaper was founded on January 28, 1868. Initially an afternoon paper, it was published Monday through Saturday with a Sunday-morning edition added later.

In 1940, the Eagle acquired the Reading Times, which was a morning paper, but they remained separate papers.  The staff of the two papers was combined in 1982.  In June 2002, the Reading Times ceased publication, and the Eagle became a morning paper. Both papers had been publishing a joint Saturday-morning edition since 1988.

Author John Updike worked at the Eagle as a copyboy in his youth for several summer internships in the early 1950s, and wrote several feature articles.

In 2009, the newspaper switched to a Berliner format and laid off 52 employees in late April of that year.

After celebrating its sesquicentennial of local ownership and editorial control, the family-owned newspaper suffered financial hardships, and cut 16 percent of its newsroom staff on May 23, 2018, also reverting to its previous broadsheet size a couple of months later. Less than a year later, the company announced it was filing for bankruptcy protection on March 20, 2019. In May 2019, the newspaper was acquired by the Denver, Colorado-based MediaNews Group (also known as Digital First Media) in May 2019. As of July 1, 2021, MNG has laid off numerous employees from the newsroom, where no salary increases have been issued since 2008. MNG also doesn't contribute to a 401(k) plan.

Sunday edition
For many years, the Sunday Reading Eagle featured a banner on its Sunday comics section saying "Biggest Comics Section in the Land", running over 50 features until the late 1980s, and occupying two sections until 1995. It carried half pages of Prince Valiant, Hägar the Horrible, and Tarzan, as well as smaller versions of Dick Tracy, The Phantom, and many popular humor strips. On July 8, 2018, however, it followed the path of most dwindling American newspapers, and reduced the size of its comics section and of the strips it carries.

References

External links
 Reading Eagle
 Google News archives 1868-2008

1868 establishments in Pennsylvania
Daily newspapers published in Pennsylvania
Companies that filed for Chapter 11 bankruptcy in 2019
Publications established in 1868
Reading, Pennsylvania